Lodge Hill may refer to:
 Lodge Hill, Bristol, a residential area of Bristol, England
 Lodge Hill, Cornwall, a village in Cornwall
 Lodge Hill Camp, Medway (Kent), a former military site which is now designated a SSSI (Site of Special Scientific Interest) important for nightingales
 Lodge Hill Cemetery, Birmingham, a cemetery and crematorium in Selly Oak, Birmingham, England
 Lodge Hill, Ditchling, East Sussex, a hill in Ditchling, East Sussex, England